Letta Matlhodi Maseko is a South African politician serving as a Member of the Western Cape Provincial Parliament for the Democratic Alliance since May 2014. Maseko is the current chairperson of the Standing Committee on Human Settlements in the legislature.

Political career
Maseko is a member of the Democratic Alliance. She worked as a project coordinator in the housing department of the Cederberg Local Municipality until her appointment as a proportional representation councillor in 2012.

In 2014, she was elected to the Western Cape Provincial Parliament. She was then elected chairperson of the legislature's Standing Committee on Human Settlements. Maseko remained in the position following her re-election in 2019.

References

External links

Living people
Year of birth missing (living people)
Democratic Alliance (South Africa) politicians
Members of the Western Cape Provincial Parliament
21st-century South African politicians